Samut Songkhram is one of the central provinces (changwat) of Thailand.

Neighbouring provinces are (from the south clockwise) Phetchaburi, Ratchaburi and Samut Sakhon. Local people call Samut Songkhram Mae Klong. The province is the smallest in area of all Thai provinces. Chang and Eng Bunker, the famous Siamese twins were born here on 11 May 1811.

Toponymy
The word "samut" originates from the Sanskrit word समुद्र samudra meaning 'ocean', and the word "songkhram" from Sanskrit संग्राम saṃgrāma meaning 'war'. Hence the name of the province literally means 'war ocean'.
However, this province is colloquially known as "Mae Klong" after the name of the main river that flows past the area.

Geography
Samut Songkhram is at the mouth of the Mae Klong River to the Bay of Bangkok (upper Gulf of Thailand). With several canals (khlong) the water of the river is spread through the province for irrigation. At the coast are many lakes for producing sea salt. The sandbar Don Hoi Lot at the mouth of the river is famous for its endemic shell population of Solen regularis.

It covers a total area of 416.7 km2 (about 160.9 sq mi). It can be considered the smallest province in Thailand.

This province is home to places of worship of the three major religions. There are 110 Buddhist temples, two Christian churches and one mosque.

History
Samut Songkhram or Mae Klong or Suan Nok (outside garden) was a part of Mueang Ratchaburi in the past. The old name of Mae Klong is Bang Chang which was centered at Tambon Amphawa, Samut Songkhram (from the district at present). During the transition from the Ayutthaya to the Thon Buri periods, it was separated from Ratchaburi and named Mueang Mae Klong. 

Samut Songkhram was historically important during the establishment of Thon Buri as the kingdom’s capital by King Taksin the Great. When the Burmese led an army to Tambon Bang Kung, the king gathered the people to build a fort and prevent the city from capture by the Burmese troops. This was an important act against the Burmese invaders at that time. 

Mueang Mae Klong (actually pronounced "Mae Glawng"), changed its name into Samut Songkhram but the actual year is not known. It is assumed it occurred in 1752 to 1756 because the name of the province first appeared in the evidence from the first Thai enacted law: Later, a decree was found,issued from the reign of King Borom Urn Baromgoate in 1756 and was identified as ordered to The Lord Rattanathibet, the Grand marshal of the Court. Apparently Kun Wisetvanish (Chean Ar Pan Teck), Kun Thip, and Meun Rukka Auksorn were daring ask to establish casinos in Samut Songkhram, Ratchaburi and Samut Prakan. 

Samut Songkhram is the birthplace of many famous Thai people whether King Rama II who was born in 1767 in Amphawa District or Chang and Eng Bunker who were born in 1811.

Administrative divisions

Provincial government
The province is divided into three districts (amphoe). The districts are further divided into 38 subdistricts (tambons) and 284 villages (mubans).

Symbols
The provincial seal shows a drum over a river. The Thai word for drum is klong, thus refers to the Mae Klong River, as well as the old name of the province, Mae Klong. On both sides of the river coconut trees are displayed as one of the main products of the province.

The provincial tree is Casuarina equisetifolia. Siamese giant carp (Catlocarpio siamensis) is a provincial fish.

The provincial slogan is "City of Hoi Lot, Top Lychee, King Rama II Memorial Park, the Mae Klong River, and Luangpho Ban Laem".

Economy
Samut Songkhram is a leader in Thai salt production, with 4,535 rai worked in 2011 by 111 households to produce salt.

Aside from salt Samut Songkhram is also known for the variety of fruits, especially lychee, pomelo and coconut.

Pla thu (ปลาทู, 'short mackerel') is regarded as an important commercial fish and the most famous product of the province. Mackerel of Samut Songkhram is well known as "Pla thu Mae Klong". Because the area of the province borders the Bay of Bangkok which is rich in plankton, they are regarded as the staple food of this fish species. Therefore, short mackerel of Samut Songkhram has a large body size and the meat is delicious. They can be cooked to a variety of foods such as Pla thu tom madan (ปลาทูต้มมะดัน, 'Pla thu in spicy and sour soup'), Chu chee pla thu (ฉู่ฉี่ปลาทู, 'Pla thu in red curry sauce'), Pla thu sa tia (ปลาทูซาเตี๊ยะ, Pla thu in sweet black soup), burger Pla thu, Pla thu meat, made into a burger filling which can be eaten only in Samut Songkhram. And exclusive Khao tom sam kasat (ข้าวต้มสามกษัตริย์, lit: "three kings porridge"), porridge with the main ingredients, Pla thu, prawn and fresh squid, recount that this menu has its origin from the King Rama V visiting the people at Mae Klong. He has prepared this menu based on his own original ideas until it became a legendary food.

Local traditions
The Celebrations of King Rama II: organized every early February, which was the birth month of King Rama II at King Rama II Memorial Park.
Worship and bathing Luangpho Ban Laem ceremony: organized every mid April, which falls on Songkran festival at Wat Ban Laem.
Mackerel festival: organized regularly at the end of the year (November or December) to promote the consumption of Pla thu at Provincial Hall.

Transport

Rail
Samut Songkhram's main station, Maeklong, is on the Maeklong Railway. The railway is known for its route through the Maeklong Railway Market, nicknamed, meaning the 'umbrella pulldown market'. It is one of the largest seafood markets in Thailand, and is centred on the Maeklong Railway's track. Whenever a train approaches, the awnings and shop fronts are moved back from the rails, to be replaced once the train has passed.

Road
Rama II Road is a main road of Samut Songkhram, it is a road that leads to south as well as Petchkasem Road, starting from Bangkok's Thonburi side. Its named in honour to King Rama II. Samut Songkhram is about 63 km (39 mi) from Bangkok by this road.

The famous floating market, Talat Nam Amphawa can be reached by this road.

Human achievement index 2017

Since 2003, United Nations Development Programme (UNDP) in Thailand has tracked progress on human development at sub-national level using the Human achievement index (HAI), a composite index covering all the eight key areas of human development. National Economic and Social Development Board (NESDB) has taken over this task since 2017.

References

External links

Province page from the Tourist Authority of Thailand 
Provincial website (Thai)

Samut Songkhram provincial map, coat of arms and postal stamp 

 
Provinces of Thailand
Gulf of Thailand